Grias longirachis is a species of woody plant in the family Lecythidaceae. It is found only in Ecuador. Its natural habitats are subtropical or tropical moist lowland forests and subtropical or tropical moist montane forests.

References

longirachis
Endemic flora of Ecuador
Endangered plants
Taxonomy articles created by Polbot